Rutherfordium (104Rf) is a synthetic element and thus has no stable isotopes. A standard atomic weight cannot be given. The first isotope to be synthesized was either 259Rf in 1966 or 257Rf in 1969. There are 16 known radioisotopes from 253Rf to 270Rf (3 of which, 266Rf, 268Rf, and 270Rf, are unconfirmed) and 4 isomers. The longest-lived isotope is 267Rf with a half-life of 48 minutes, and the longest-lived isomer is 261mRf with a half-life of 81 seconds.

List of isotopes 

|-
| rowspan=2|253Rf
| rowspan=2 style="text-align:right" | 104
| rowspan=2 style="text-align:right" | 149
| rowspan=2|253.10044(44)#
| rowspan=2|13(5) ms
| SF
| (various)
| rowspan=2|(7/2)(+#)
|-
| α
| 249No
|-
| style="text-indent:1em" | 253mRf
| colspan="3" style="text-indent:2em" | 200(150)# keV
| 52(14) µs[]
| SF
| (various)
| (1/2)(−#)
|-
| rowspan=2|254Rf
| rowspan=2 style="text-align:right" | 104
| rowspan=2 style="text-align:right" | 150
| rowspan=2|254.10005(30)#
| rowspan=2|23(3) µs
| SF (99.7%)
| (various)
| rowspan=2|0+
|-
| α (.3%)
| 250No
|-
| rowspan=2|255Rf
| rowspan=2 style="text-align:right" | 104
| rowspan=2 style="text-align:right" | 151
| rowspan=2|255.10127(12)#
| rowspan=2|1.64(11) s
| SF (52%)
| (various)
| rowspan=2|(9/2−)#
|-
| α (48%)
| 251No
|-
| rowspan=2|256Rf
| rowspan=2 style="text-align:right" | 104
| rowspan=2 style="text-align:right" | 152
| rowspan=2|256.101152(19)
| rowspan=2|6.45(14) ms
| SF (96%)
| (various)
| rowspan=2|0+
|-
| α (6%)
| 252No
|-
| rowspan=3|257Rf
| rowspan=3 style="text-align:right" | 104
| rowspan=3 style="text-align:right" | 153
| rowspan=3|257.102917(12)
| rowspan=3|4.7(3) s
| α (79%)
| 253No
| rowspan=3|(1/2+)
|-
| β+ (18%)
| 257Lr
|-
| SF (2.4%)
| (various)
|-
| style="text-indent:1em" | 257mRf
| colspan="3" style="text-indent:2em" | 114(17) keV
| 3.9(4) s
|
|
| (11/2−)
|-
| rowspan=2|258Rf
| rowspan=2 style="text-align:right" | 104
| rowspan=2 style="text-align:right" | 154
| rowspan=2|258.10343(3)
| rowspan=2|12(2) ms
| SF (87%)
| (various)
| rowspan=2|0+
|-
| α (13%)
| 254No
|-
| rowspan=3|259Rf
| rowspan=3 style="text-align:right" | 104
| rowspan=3 style="text-align:right" | 155
| rowspan=3|259.10560(8)#
| rowspan=3| 2.8(4) s
| α (93%)
| 255No
| rowspan=3| 7/2+#
|-
| SF (7%)
| (various)
|-
| β+ (.3%)
| 259Lr
|-
| rowspan=2|260Rf
| rowspan=2 style="text-align:right" | 104
| rowspan=2 style="text-align:right" | 156
| rowspan=2|260.10644(22)#
| rowspan=2|21(1) ms
| SF (98%)
| (various)
| rowspan=2|0+
|-
| α (2%)
| 256No
|-
| rowspan=3|261Rf
| rowspan=3 style="text-align:right" | 104
| rowspan=3 style="text-align:right" | 157
| rowspan=3|261.10877(5)
| rowspan=3|68 s
| α (76%)
| 257No
| rowspan=3|9/2+#
|-
| β+ (14%)
| 261Lr
|-
| SF (10%)
| (various)
|-
| rowspan=2 style="text-indent:1em" | 261mRf
| rowspan=2 colspan="3" style="text-indent:2em" | 70(100)# keV
| rowspan=2|1.9(4) s
| SF (73%)
| (various)
| rowspan=2|3/2+#
|-
| α (27%)
| 257No
|-
| rowspan=2|262Rf
| rowspan=2 style="text-align:right" | 104
| rowspan=2 style="text-align:right" | 158
| rowspan=2|262.10993(24)#
| rowspan=2|2.3(4) s
| SF (99.2%)
| (various)
| rowspan=2|0+
|-
| α (.8%)
| 258No
|-
| style="text-indent:1em" | 262mRf
| colspan="3" style="text-indent:2em" | 600(400)# keV
| 47(5) ms
| SF
| (various)
| high
|-
| rowspan=2|263Rf
| rowspan=2 style="text-align:right" | 104
| rowspan=2 style="text-align:right" | 159
| rowspan=2|263.1125(2)#
| rowspan=2|11(3) min
| SF (70%)
| (various)
| rowspan=2|3/2+#
|-
| α (30%)
| 259No
|-
| 265Rf
| style="text-align:right" | 104
| style="text-align:right" | 161
| 265.11668(39)#
| 
| SF
| (various)
| 
|-
| 266Rf
| style="text-align:right" | 104
| style="text-align:right" | 162
| 266.11817(50)#
| 23 s#
| SF
| (various)
| 0+
|-
| 267Rf
| style="text-align:right" | 104
| style="text-align:right" | 163
| 267.12179(62)#
| 
| SF
| (various)
| 13/2−#
|-
| 268Rf
| style="text-align:right" | 104
| style="text-align:right" | 164
| 268.12397(77)#
| 1.4 s#
| SF
| (various)
| 0+
|-
| 270Rf
| style="text-align:right" | 104
| style="text-align:right" | 166
|
| 20 ms#
| SF
| (various)
| 0+

Nucleosynthesis 
Super-heavy elements such as rutherfordium are produced by bombarding lighter elements in particle accelerators that induces fusion reactions. Whereas most of the isotopes of rutherfordium can be synthesized directly this way, some heavier ones have only been observed as decay products of elements with higher atomic numbers.

Depending on the energies involved, the former are separated into "hot" and "cold". In hot fusion reactions, very light, high-energy projectiles are accelerated toward very heavy targets (actinides), giving rise to compound nuclei at high excitation energy (~40–50 MeV) that may either fission or evaporate several (3 to 5) neutrons. In cold fusion reactions, the produced fused nuclei have a relatively low excitation energy (~10–20 MeV), which decreases the probability that these products will undergo fission reactions. As the fused nuclei cool to the ground state, they require emission of only one or two neutrons, and thus, allows for the generation of more neutron-rich products. The latter is a distinct concept from that of where nuclear fusion claimed to be achieved at room temperature conditions (see cold fusion).

Hot fusion studies
The synthesis of rutherfordium was first attempted in 1964 by the team at Dubna using the hot fusion reaction of neon-22 projectiles with plutonium-242 targets:
 +  →  + 3 or 5 .
The first study produced evidence for a spontaneous fission with a 0.3 second half-life and another one at 8 seconds. While the former observation was eventually retracted, the latter eventually became associated with the 259Rf isotope. In 1966, the Soviet team repeated the experiment using a chemical study of volatile chloride products. They identified a volatile chloride with eka-hafnium properties that decayed fast through spontaneous fission. This gave strong evidence for the formation of RfCl4, and although a half-life was not accurately measured, later evidence suggested that the product was most likely 259Rf. The team repeated the experiment several times over the next few years, and in 1971, they revised the spontaneous fission half-life for the isotope at 4.5 seconds.

In 1969, researchers at the University of California led by Albert Ghiorso, tried to confirm the original results reported at Dubna. In a reaction of curium-248 with oxygen-16, they were unable to confirm the result of the Soviet team, but managed to observe the spontaneous fission of 260Rf with a very short half-life of 10–30 ms:
 +  →  + 4 .
In 1970, the American team also studied the same reaction with oxygen-18 and identified 261Rf with a half-life of 65 seconds (later refined to 75 seconds). Later experiments at the Lawrence Berkeley National Laboratory in California also revealed the formation of a short-lived isomer of 262Rf (which undergoes spontaneous fission with a half-life of 47 ms), and spontaneous fission activities with long lifetimes tentatively assigned to 263Rf.

The reaction of californium-249 with carbon-13 was also investigated by the Ghiorso team, which indicated the formation of the short-lived 258Rf (which undergoes spontaneous fission in 11 ms):
 +  →  + 4 .
In trying to confirm these results by using carbon-12 instead, they also observed the first alpha decays from 257Rf.

The reaction of berkelium-249 with nitrogen-14 was first studied in Dubna in 1977, and in 1985, researchers there confirmed the formation of the 260Rf isotope which quickly undergoes spontaneous fission in 28 ms:
 +  →  + 3 .

In 1996 the isotope 262Rf was observed in LBNL from the fusion of plutonium-244 with neon-22:
 +  →  + 4 or 5 .
The team determined a half-life of 2.1 seconds, in contrast to earlier reports of 47 ms and suggested that the two half-lives might be due to different isomeric states of 262Rf. Studies on the same reaction by a team at Dubna, lead to the observation in 2000 of alpha decays from 261Rf and spontaneous fissions of 261mRf.

The hot fusion reaction using a uranium target was first reported at Dubna in 2000:
 +  →  + x  (x = 3, 4, 5, 6).
They observed decays from 260Rf and 259Rf, and later for 259Rf. In 2006, as part of their program on the study of uranium targets in hot fusion reactions, the team at LBNL also observed 261Rf.

Cold fusion studies
The first cold fusion experiments involving element 104 were done in 1974 at Dubna, by using light titanium-50 nuclei aimed at lead-208 isotope targets:
 +  →  + x  (x = 1, 2, or 3).
The measurement of a spontaneous fission activity was assigned to 256Rf, while later studies done at the Gesellschaft für Schwerionenforschung Institute (GSI), also measured decay properties for the isotopes 257Rf, and 255Rf.

In 1974 researchers at Dubna investigated the reaction of lead-207 with titanium-50 to produce the isotope 255Rf. In a 1994 study at GSI using the lead-206 isotope, 255Rf as well as 254Rf were detected. 253Rf was similarly detected that year when lead-204 was used instead.

Decay studies
Most isotopes with an atomic mass below 262 have also observed as decay products of elements with a higher atomic number, allowing for refinement of their previously measured properties. Heavier isotopes of rutherfordium have only been observed as decay products. For example, a few alpha decay events terminating in 267Rf were observed in the decay chain of darmstadtium-279 since 2004:
 →  +  →  +  →  + .
This further underwent spontaneous fission with a half-life of about 1.3 h.

Investigations on the synthesis of the dubnium-263 isotope in 1999 at the University of Bern revealed events consistent with electron capture to form 263Rf. A rutherfordium fraction was separated, and several spontaneous fission events with long half-lives of about 15 minutes were observed, as well as alpha decays with half-lives of about 10 minutes. Reports on the decay chain of flerovium-285 in 2010 showed five sequential alpha decays that terminate in 265Rf, which further undergoes spontaneous fission with a half-life of 152 seconds.

Some experimental evidence was obtained in 2004 for an even heavier isotope, 268Rf, in the decay chain of an isotope of moscovium:
 →  +  →  +  →  +  →  +  →  +  ? →  + .
However, the last step in this chain was uncertain. After observing the five alpha decay events that generate dubnium-268, spontaneous fission events were observed with a long half-life. It is unclear whether these events were due to direct spontaneous fission of 268Db, or 268Db produced electron capture events with long half-lives to generate 268Rf. If the latter is produced and decays with a short half-life, the two possibilities cannot be distinguished. Given that the electron capture of 268Db cannot be detected, these spontaneous fission events may be due to 268Rf, in which case the half-life of this isotope cannot be extracted. A similar mechanism is proposed for the formation of the even heavier isotope 270Rf as a short-lived daughter of 270Db (in the decay chain of 294Ts, first synthesized in 2010) which then undergoes spontaneous fission:
 →  +  →  +  →  +  →  +  →  +  →  +  ? →  + .

According to a 2007 report on the synthesis of nihonium, the isotope 282Nh was twice observed to undergo a similar decay to form 266Db. In one case this underwent spontaneous fission with a half-life of 22 minutes. Given that the electron capture of 266Db cannot be detected, these spontaneous fission events may be due to 266Rf, in which case the half-life of this isotope cannot be extracted. In the other case, no spontaneous fission event was observed; it could have been missed, or 266Db might have undergone two more alpha decays to long-lived 258Md, with a half-life (51.5 d) longer than the total time of the experiment.

Nuclear isomerism

Several early studies on the synthesis of 263Rf have indicated that this nuclide decays primarily by spontaneous fission with a half-life of 10–20 minutes. More recently, a study of hassium isotopes allowed the synthesis of atoms of 263Rf decaying with a shorter half-life of 8 seconds. These two different decay modes must be associated with two isomeric states, but specific assignments are difficult due to the low number of observed events.

During research on the synthesis of rutherfordium isotopes utilizing the 244Pu(22Ne,5n)261Rf reaction, the product was found to undergo exclusive 8.28 MeV alpha decay with a half-life of 78 seconds. Later studies at GSI on the synthesis of copernicium and hassium isotopes produced conflicting data, as 261Rf produced in the decay chain was found to undergo 8.52 MeV alpha decay with a half-life of 4 seconds. Later results indicated a predominant fission branch. These contradictions led to some doubt on the discovery of copernicium. The first isomer is currently denoted 261aRf (or simply 261Rf) whilst the second is denoted 261bRf (or 261mRf). However, it is thought that the first nucleus belongs to a high-spin ground state and the latter to a low-spin metastable state.
The discovery and confirmation of 261bRf provided proof for the discovery of copernicium in 1996.

A detailed spectroscopic study of the production of 257Rf nuclei using the reaction 208Pb(50Ti,n)257Rf allowed the identification of an isomeric level in 257Rf. The work confirmed that 257gRf has a complex spectrum with 15 alpha lines. A level structure diagram was calculated for both isomers. Similar isomers were reported for 256Rf also.

Chemical yields of isotopes

Cold fusion 
The table below provides cross-sections and excitation energies for cold fusion reactions producing rutherfordium isotopes directly. Data in bold represents maxima derived from excitation function measurements. + represents an observed exit channel.

Hot fusion 
The table below provides cross-sections and excitation energies for hot fusion reactions producing rutherfordium isotopes directly. Data in bold represents maxima derived from excitation function measurements. + represents an observed exit channel.

References 

 Isotope masses from:

 Isotopic compositions and standard atomic masses from:

 Half-life, spin, and isomer data selected from the following sources.

External links
http://www.radiochemistry.org/periodictable/elements/isotopes_data/104.html
http://www-phynu.cea.fr/science_en_ligne/carte_potentiels_microscopiques/choix/isotopes/z104_eng.html
http://www.springermaterials.com/docs/info/978-3-540-70609-0_7730.html

 
Rutherfordium
Rutherfordium